Aleksandrs Golubovs (1959 – 19 May 2010) was a Latvian politician. He was a member of the Socialist Party of Latvia and a deputy of the 6th, 7th, 8th and 9th Saeima (Latvian Parliament). He began his last term in parliament on November 7, 2006. Golubovs died on 19 May 2010, during an official visit to Belarus.

References

External links
Archive on members of the Supreme Soviet and Saeima since 1990 on saeima.lv

1959 births
2010 deaths
People from Ludza Municipality
Latvian people of Russian descent
Socialist Party of Latvia politicians
Deputies of the 6th Saeima
Deputies of the 7th Saeima
Deputies of the 8th Saeima
Deputies of the 9th Saeima
Riga Stradiņš University alumni